Export-oriented industrialization (EOI) sometimes called export substitution industrialization (ESI), export led industrialization (ELI) or export-led growth is a trade and economic policy aiming to speed up the industrialization process of a country by exporting goods for which the nation has a comparative advantage. Export-led growth implies opening domestic markets to foreign competition in exchange for market access in other countries.

However, this may not be true of all domestic markets, as governments may aim to protect specific nascent industries so they grow and are able to exploit their future comparative advantage and in practice the converse can occur. For example, many East Asian countries had strong barriers on imports from the 1960s to the 1980s.

Reduced tariff barriers, a fixed exchange rate (a devaluation of national currency is often employed to facilitate exports), and government support for exporting sectors are all an example of policies adopted to promote EOI and, ultimately, economic development. Export-oriented industrialization was particularly characteristic of the development of the national economies of the developed East Asian Tigers: Hong Kong, Singapore, South Korea, and Taiwan in the post-World War II period.

Export-led growth is an economic strategy used by some developing countries.  This strategy seeks to find a niche in the world economy for a certain type of export.  Industries producing this export may receive governmental subsidies and better access to the local markets.  By implementing this strategy, countries hope to gain enough hard currency to import commodities manufactured more cheaply elsewhere.

In addition, a recent mathematical study shows that export-led growth is where wage growth is repressed and linked to the productivity growth of non-tradable goods in a country with under-valued currency. In such a country, the productivity growth of export goods is greater than the proportional wage growth and the productivity growth of non-tradable goods. Thus, export price decreases in the export-led growth country and makes it more competitive in international trade.

Origins 
From the Great Depression to the years after World War II, under-developed and developing countries started to have a hard time economically.  During this time, many foreign markets were closed and the danger of trading and shipping in war-time waters drove many of these countries to look for another solution to development.  The initial solution to this dilemma was called import substitution industrialization.  Both Latin American and Asian countries used this strategy at first.  However, during the 1950s and 1960s the Asian countries, like Taiwan and South Korea, started focusing their development outward, resulting in an export-led growth strategy.  Many of the Latin American countries continued with import substitution industrialization, just expanding its scope.  Some have pointed out that because of the success of the Asian countries, especially Taiwan and South Korea, export-led growth should be considered the best strategy to promote development.

Significance 
Export-led growth is important for mainly two reasons: The first is that export-led growth improves the country's foreign-currency finances, as well as surpass their debts as long as the facilities and materials for the exports exist.  The second, if more debatable reason, is that increased export-growth can trigger greater productivity, thus creating even more exports in a positive, upward spiral cycle.

The nomenclature of this concept appears in  J.S.L McCombie et al. (1994):

yB denotes the relationship between expenditures and income in foreign-currency trade; it marks the balance of payments constraint

yA is the growth capacity of the country, which can never be more than the current capacity

yC is the current capacity of growth, or how well the country is producing at that moment

(i)  yB=yA=yC:  balance-of-payments equilibrium and full employment

(ii) yB=yA<yC:  balance-of-payments equilibrium and growing unemployment

(iii)yB<yA=yC:  increasing balance-of-payments deficit and full employment

(iv) yB<yA<yC:  increasing balance-of-payments deficit and growing unemployment

(v)  yB>yA=yC:  increasing balance-of-payments surplus and full employment

(vi) yB>yA<yC:  increasing balance-of-payments surplus and growing unemployment (McCombie 423)

Countries with both unemployment and balance-of-payments problems are supposed, according to the dominant economic paradigm, to orient their policies towards export-led growth aiming to achieve either situation (i) or situation (v).

Types of exports 
There are essentially two types of exports used in this context: manufactured goods and raw materials.

Manufactured goods are the exports most commonly used to achieve export-led growth.  However, many times these industries are competing against industrialized countries' industries, which often have better technology, better educated workers, and more capital to start with.  Therefore, this strategy must be well thought out and planned.  A country must find a certain export that they can manufacture well, in competition with industrialized industries.

Raw materials are another export option.  However, this strategy is risky compared to manufactured goods.  If the terms of trade shift unfavorably, a country must export more and more of the raw materials to import the same amount of commodities, making the trade profits very difficult to come by.

Criticism and counter arguments

Theoretical
Mainstream economic analysis points out that EOI presupposes that a government contains the relevant market-knowledge enabling it to judge whether or not an industry to be given development subsidies will prove a good investment in the future. The ability of a government to do this, it is argued, is probably limited as it will not have occurred through the natural interaction of the market forces of supply and demand.  Additionally, they claim that the exploitation of a potential comparative advantage requires a significant amount of investment, of which governments can only supply a limited amount. In many LDCs, it is necessary for multinational corporations to provide the foreign direct investment, knowledge, skills and training needed to develop an industry and exploit the future comparative advantage.

This line of argument runs against heterodox (and particularly Post-Keynesian) analysis. There, the investment requirements for state investment, denominated in the national currency, are never operationally constrained; any claim about the "limited" ability of the state to finance expenditures in its own currency is rejected. Neither, Post-Keynesians state, is there a question of the private sector competing with the state for available funds, due to their opinions on hypotheses about "crowding out". As to the claim about the state's inability to engage in basic, primary, "paradigm changing" investment in research and development, the work of economists such as Mariana Mazzucato has claimed that the claim is groundless.

Scholars have claimed that governments in East Asia, nonetheless, did have the ability and the resources to identify and exploit comparative advantages. EOI has, therefore, been supported as a development strategy for poor countries - because of its success in the Four Asian Tigers.

This claim has been challenged by a minority of non-mainstream economists, who have instead emphasised the very specific historical, political, and legislative conditions in East Asia that were not present elsewhere, and which allowed for the success of EOI in these nations. Japanese producers, for example, were given preferential access to US and European markets after World War II. Additionally, some domestic production was explicitly protected from outside competition, for an extensive period of time and until local business entities had become strong enough to compete internationally. They claim that the protectionist policies are crucial to the success of EOI.

Empirical
Despite its support in mainstream economic circles, EOI's ostensible success has been increasingly challenged over recent years due to a growing number of examples in which it has not yielded the expected results.  EOI increases market sensitivity to exogenous factors, and is partially responsible for the damage done by the 1997 Asian financial crisis to the economies of countries who used export-oriented industrialization.  This is something which occurred during the financial crisis of 2007–08 and subsequent global recession. Similarly, localized disasters can cause worldwide shortages of the products that countries specialize in.  For example, in 2010, flooding in Thailand led to a shortage of hard drives.

Other criticisms include that export oriented industrialization has limited success if the economy is experiencing a decline in its terms of trade, where prices for its exports are rising at a slower rate than that of its imports.  This is true of many economies aiming to exploit their comparative advantage in primary commodities as they have a long-term trend of declining prices, noted in the Singer-Prebisch thesis though there are criticisms of this thesis as practical contradictions have occurred. Primary-commodity dependency also links to the weakness of excessive specialization as primary commodities have incredible price volatility, given the inelastic nature of their demand, leading to a disproportionately large change in price given a change in demand for them.

Nobel laureate Paul Krugman has criticized what he called the "popular views" on macroeconomic policy as they were shaped in the 1950s, and, particularly, regarding productivity and foreign-trade economic policy. The "highly influential" position that "the United States needs higher productivity so that it can compete in today’s global economy", he wrote, is akin to the person supporting it  “wearing a flashing neon sign that reads:  'I don't know that I'm talking about'."

Logical
One of the main arguments against the assumption of export-oriented policies as potential solutions in a country's problems rests on the tenet that an economic orientation should be applicable to every country, in general and allowing for local conditions. If following an export-oriented path is beneficial for country A, then it should also be so for country B, ceteris paribus. However, that is an impossible task since, as a matter of trivial logic, it is impossible for all the countries on the planet to become net exporters.

Notes 

Industrial policy
Export